The 1923 NCAA baseball season, play of college baseball in the United States organized by the National Collegiate Athletic Association (NCAA) began in the spring of 1923.  Play largely consisted of regional matchups, some organized by conferences, and ended in June.  No national championship event was held until 1947.  In the northeast, many college began their seasons on or about March 31.

Conference Changes
The Pacific Coast Conference divided into two divisions, with the California schools (California, Southern California, Stanford) making up the Southern and the remaining five schools (Idaho, Oregon, Oregon State, Washington, Washington State) forming the Northern.

Conference winners
This is a partial list of conference champions from the 1923 season.

References